Mitch Healey (born 11 May 1969) is an Australian former professional rugby league footballer, who played for the Cronulla-Sutherland Sharks.

Debut
His first grade debut was on Sunday, 23 July 1989 against the Canterbury-Bankstown Bulldogs at Endeavour Field. He started his début from the bench. Cronulla went on to win the match quite comfortably 25–10.

Playing career
Healey played from 1989-2000 scoring a total of 33 tries in 222 games. Healey kicked a total of seven career field goals, including three against the North Sydney Bears. Healey kicked 139 goals during his time with Cronulla-Sutherland. Over his career, Healey scored a total of 418 points. In his last game of his career with the Cronulla-Sutherland Sharks, Healey scored a try against the Parramatta Eels. Healey then went on to play in the Super League with the Castleford Tigers (Heritage № 773). Whilst at the Castleford Tigers he partnered Danny Orr in the halves. Healey was injured for most of his 1st season in 2001 but in 2002 and 2003 he captured some form and proved to be a good player for the Castleford Tigers.

Post playing
Healey who had previous coaching experience working as assistant to Souths NRL coaches Paul Langmack and Arthur Katinas in 2004, took over reins of the under-20 Cronulla side from Aaron Raper.

References

1969 births
Living people
Australian rugby league players
Castleford Tigers players
Cronulla-Sutherland Sharks players
People from the Sutherland Shire
Rugby league props
Rugby league players from Sydney